Gospel Oak railway station is in the London Borough of Camden in north-west London. It is on the North London line (NLL) and is also the western passenger terminus of the Gospel Oak to Barking Line – known informally as GOBLIN. Passengers using Oyster cards are required to tap on interchange Oyster card readers when changing between the two lines. The station is in Travelcard Zone 2, and is managed by London Overground which runs all passenger trains at the station.

History

It was renamed Gospel Oak in 1867 when a new station more appropriately named Kentish Town was opened about a mile south on the same line (that station is now ). Due to financial constraints a planned connection from the Tottenham and Hampstead Junction Railway to Gospel Oak station was not added until 4 June 1888, some 20 years after that railway opened, and then without a link to the North London Line due to other companies' opposition.

From 1926 to 1981, the station was not a passenger interchange: passenger trains left the Barking line at Tufnell Park and descended the gradient to  station. In 1981 that passenger service from Barking was diverted from Kentish Town to Gospel Oak with the terminal platform rebuilt on the north side of the existing station.

The North London Line through Gospel Oak was electrified on the fourth-rail 660 volt DC system in 1916 by the LNWR: in the 1970s that was changed to 750 volt DC third rail. In 1996, the line from Willesden through Gospel Oak to Camden was closed during conversion to 25 kv AC overhead.

To allow four-car trains to run on the London Overground network, the North London Line between this station and  closed from February 2010 to 1 June 2010, for installing a new signalling system and for extending 30 platforms. Until May 2011, there was a reduced service with no services on Sundays while the upgrade work continued.

Design

The platforms are high above street level with stairs and two lifts, one serving westbound trains, and one serving eastbound trains and the Barking line. The North London Line has two platforms and the Barking line has a short terminal platform north of which are two separate through freight tracks which join the NLL just west of the station. Oyster ticket barriers are in operation.

Services

The typical off-peak service at the station in trains per hour is:
 4 eastbound to 
 8 eastbound to 
 4 westbound to Clapham Junction
 4 westbound to

Connections
London Buses route C11 serves the station.

In arts and music
The two brick skew arch bridges by which the trains cross Gordon House Road are shown in the cover photograph of the 1997 Gospel Oak EP by Irish singer Sinéad O'Connor.

Notes

References

External links

Railway stations in the London Borough of Camden
DfT Category D stations
Former London and North Western Railway stations
Railway stations in Great Britain opened in 1860
Former Tottenham and Hampstead Junction Railway stations
Railway stations in Great Britain opened in 1888
Railway stations in Great Britain closed in 1926
Railway stations in Great Britain opened in 1981
Railway stations served by London Overground